Harvey is a small community in Thunder Bay District, Ontario, Canada.

References

Communities in Thunder Bay District